The external iliac arteries are two major arteries which bifurcate off the common iliac arteries anterior to the sacroiliac joint of the pelvis.

Structure

The external iliac artery arises from the bifurcation of the common iliac artery. They proceed anterior and inferior along the medial border of the psoas major muscles. They exit the pelvic girdle posterior and inferior to the inguinal ligament. This occurs about one third laterally from the insertion point of the inguinal ligament on the pubic tubercle. At this point they are referred to as the femoral arteries.

Branches

Function 
The external iliac artery provides the main blood supply to the legs. It passes down along the brim of the pelvis and gives off two large branches - the "inferior epigastric artery" and a "deep circumflex artery." These vessels supply blood to the muscles and skin in the lower abdominal wall. The external iliac artery passes beneath the inguinal ligament in the lower part of the abdomen and becomes the femoral artery.

Clinical significance 
The external iliac artery is usually the artery used to attach the renal artery to the recipient of a kidney transplant.

Additional images

See also
 Internal iliac artery
 Common iliac artery

References

External links
  - "The Female Pelvis: The External and Internal Iliac Vessels"
  - "Sagittal view of the internal iliac artery and its branches in the female pelvis. "
 
 
Hypogastric artery - thefreedictionary.com

Arteries of the abdomen
Arteries of the lower limb